The Plymouth Acclaim is a mid-size sedan produced in the 1989 to 1995 model years. The Acclaim was Plymouth's updated replacement for both the similarly sized E-body Caravelle and the K-body Reliant. Badge engineering was employed to give Dodge and Chrysler their own versions of the AA-body Acclaim: the Dodge Spirit, the Chrysler LeBaron sedan, and the export-market Chrysler Saratoga. It was replaced by the Plymouth Breeze in 1996.

Platform
The Acclaim was a version of the Chrysler Corporation's AA-body 4-door sedan, which was an evolutionary development of Chrysler's extended K-car platform. Acclaim (and Dodge Spirit) production ended on December 9, 1994, after a short 1995 model year and the Cab-forward Plymouth Breeze was introduced as a replacement for 1996. The Acclaim was one of the last K-car derivatives produced by Chrysler. In all, just under half a million examples of the Acclaim were built in its 7-model year run.

Market positioning
The AA-body cars were badge-engineered triplets, as were most Chrysler products of this time. The Acclaim differed from its siblings primarily in wheel choices, bodyside molding, and fascias where it sported its unique taillights and the corporate Plymouth eggcrate-grille. Like the K-body and E-body vehicles they replaced, the Acclaim and Dodge Spirit were both marketed as mainstream variants, while the Chrysler LeBaron was marketed as the luxury variant. Despite this, there was substantial overlap in trims and equipment among each car. For example, a fully loaded Acclaim was almost similar to a base LeBaron in features and price.

In addition to its entry-level base model, the Acclaim was initially available in mid-range LE and high-end LX trim. LE and LX models came equipped with features such including premium cloth seating, power windows/door locks, premium sound systems, bodyside cladding, additional exterior brightwork, and on the latter 15-inch lace-spoke aluminum wheels. In spite of this, the base model accounted for nearly 85 percent of Acclaim sales. Unlike the Spirit, the Acclaim did not receive any sport-oriented models.

The Acclaim has also been characterized as the replacement for the smaller Reliant, though the Sundance launched in 1987 is closer than the Acclaim in most dimensions to the Reliant.

Changes through the years

For 1992, the Acclaim's three trim levels were consolidated into one base model. At extra cost, it could be equipped with packages and stand-alone options previously included in LE and LX models.

The Acclaim was mildly facelifted for 1993, with a new radiator grille and other minor trim detail changes including a new chrome Pentastar hood ornament. Starting in 1993, the Acclaim was offered with a "Gold Package". This included gold pinstripes, gold bodyside trim, and gold-accented alloy wheels accented with gold paint.

A motorized shoulder belt was added to the front passenger seating position of US-market Acclaims in 1994, to comply with Federal Motor Vehicle Safety Standard 208's requirement for passive restraints. These motorized belts did not comply with Canada's safety standards. As a result, Canadian-market Acclaims continued to use a manual passenger seatbelt, and 1994-1995 Acclaims could not be legally imported in either direction. For 1995, its final model year, the 2.5-liter engine got a slightly revised cylinder head and the 4-speed A604 automatic transmission and anti-lock brakes were both dropped. Otherwise, the Acclaim remained mostly unchanged during its 6-year run.

Trim levels
base • 1989-1995
LE • 1989-1992
LX • 1989-1992

Engines

The Acclaim was available with several different engines. A  Chrysler inline-4 engine producing  with throttle-body fuel injection was standard equipment. A  Mitsubishi V6 producing  with multi-point fuel injection was standard on Acclaim LX, optional on the others. Also available on base and LE models from 1989 through 1992 was a turbocharged version of the 2.5-liter four-cylinder producing . In 1993, 1994 and 1995, a flexible-fuel Acclaim was offered, powered by a  multipoint fuel injected version of the 2.5-liter engine specially modified to run on fuel containing up to 85% ethanol.

Transmissions
Several 5-speed manual transmissions were available, depending on which engine was installed, but relatively few Acclaims were equipped with manual transmissions. The 3-speed Torqueflite automatic was the most popular installation on Acclaims with TBI and MPFI 4-cylinder engines, and was also widely installed in conjunction with the V6 in 1993 through 1995. From 1989 until 1992, most V6 Acclaims came equipped with the 4-speed A604 electronically controlled automatic.

5-speed manual
3-speed A413 automatic
3-speed A670 automatic
4-speed A604 automatic

Discontinuation and replacement
Production ended on December 21, 1994, along with the Dodge Spirit after a short run of 1995 models was produced. The LeBaron sedan was replaced by the Cirrus for 1995, and the Spirit sold alongside the new Dodge Stratus. The Plymouth Breeze was introduced for 1996, sharing the JA platform with the Cirrus and Stratus.

References

External links

 IMCDB: Plymouth Acclaims in movies & TV shows
 Allpar Plymouth Acclaim/Dodge Spirit page
 ConsumerGuide.com's page on the Acclaim

Acclaim
Front-wheel-drive vehicles
Mid-size cars
Sedans
1980s cars
1990s cars
Cars introduced in 1989
Cars discontinued in 1994